The following notable people are or have been associated with Green Bay, Wisconsin.

Politics

 W. J. Abrams, Wisconsin State Senator, Mayor of Green Bay
 David Agry, jurist and legislator
 Charles C. P. Arndt, Wisconsin Territorial Legislator
 John Penn Arndt, Wisconsin Territorial legislator
 William H. Bartran, Wisconsin State Representative and physician
 Robert C. Bassett, U.S. Presidential advisor
 John W. Byrnes, U.S. Representative from Wisconsin
 James R. Charneski, Wisconsin State Representative
 Ebenezer Childs, Wisconsin Territorial legislator
 Paul F. Clark, Nebraska State Representative
 Adolph A. Deering, Wisconsin State Representative
 Thomas A. Delaney, Wisconsin State Representative
 Jacob Dietrich, Wisconsin State Representative
 Gary T. Dilweg, Wisconsin State Representative
 Charles Doty, surveyor, military officer, Wisconsin State Assembly
 James Duane Doty, U.S. Representative from Wisconsin
 W.F. Doyle, Michigan State Senator
 Albert Gallatin Ellis, Michigan and Wisconsin Territorial legislator
 William Finnegan, Wisconsin State Representative
 Albert Gall, Indiana State Treasurer and businessman
 Eric Genrich, Wisconsin State Representative, Mayor of Green Bay
 Mark Green, U.S. Representative
 John A. Gronouski, U.S. Postmaster General
 Rosemary Hinkfuss, Wisconsin State Representative
 William E. Hoehle, Wisconsin State Representative
 John S. Horner, Governor of Michigan Territory
 Timothy O. Howe, U.S. Postmaster General
 Thomas R. Hudd, U.S. Representative from Wisconsin
 James F. Hughes, U.S. Representative from Wisconsin
 Alexander J. Irwin, Wisconsin Territorial Legislator and businessman
 Robert Irwin Jr., Michigan Territorial Legislator and businessman
 Joshua L. Johns, U.S. Representative from Wisconsin
 Jay W. Johnson, U.S. Representative from Wisconsin, Director of the U.S. Mint
 Fred F. Kaftan, Wisconsin State Senator
 David M. Kelly, Speaker of the Wisconsin State Assembly and Wisconsin State Senator
 Carol Kelso, Wisconsin State Representative
 Gaines A. Knapp, Wisconsin State Representative
 Thomas F. Konop, U.S. Representative from Wisconsin
 Gustav Kustermann, U.S. Representative from Wisconsin
 Harvey Larsen, Wisconsin State Representative
 Barbara Lawton, Lieutenant Governor of Wisconsin
 Joseph F. Loy, Wisconsin State Senator
 John Macco, Wisconsin State Representative
 Stephen Mack Jr., adventurer, founder of Rockton, Illinois
 Harold C. Malchow, Wisconsin State Representative
 John E. Martin, Chief Justice of the Wisconsin Supreme Court
 Joseph Martin, Wisconsin State representative
 Walter Melchior, Wisconsin State Representative
 Bernard N. Moran, Wisconsin State Senator
 James T. Oliver, Wisconsin State Representative
 Ben Overton, Chief Justice of the Florida Supreme Court
 John W. Reynolds Jr., Governor of Wisconsin
 Samuel Ryan Jr., Wisconsin State Representative
 John Joseph Ryba, Wisconsin State Representative
 Parlan Semple, Wisconsin State Representative
 Jerome Van Sistine, Wisconsin State Senator
 Dave Hansen (politician), Wisconsin State Senator

Military

 Steven E. Day, U.S. Coast Guard admiral
 James H. Flatley, World War II naval aviator
 Lawrence J. Fleming, U.S. Air Force Major General
 George Clay Ginty, Union Army general
 William Emery Merrill, military engineer
 Dennis Murphy, Medal of Honor recipient
 Austin Straubel, World War II army aviator
 James R. Van Den Elzen, U.S. Marine Corps general

Religion

 Claude-Jean Allouez, Jesuit missionary
 Anton Anderledy, Superior General of the Society of Jesus
 Frank Joseph Dewane, American prelate of the Roman Catholic Church
 Adam Maida, Archbishop Emeritus of the Roman Catholic Archdiocese of Detroit
 Beth Moore, evangelical
 Otto Tank, and the Tank family

Sports

 Nate Abrams, NFL player
 John Anderson, ESPN Sportscenter anchor, attended Southwest High School
 Ken Anderson, professional wrestler known as Mr. Kennedy in WWE and Mr. Anderson in TNA
 Mason Appleton, ice hockey player for the Winnipeg Jets
 Wayland Becker, NFL player
 Tony Bennett, University of Virginia men's basketball coach and former NBA player for Charlotte Hornets, attended Preble High School
 Jason Berken, MLB player
 Dan Buenning, guard for NFL Chicago Bears, attended Bay Port High School
 Art Bultman, NFL player for Brooklyn Dodgers and the Green Bay Packers
 George Whitney Calhoun, co-founder of Green Bay Packers
 Dick Campbell, NFL player
 Raymond Joseph Cannon, U.S. Representative, MLB player, attorney for Jack Dempsey and accused players of Black Sox Scandal
 Sandy Cohen, American-Israeli basketball player in the Israeli Basketball Premier League
 James Cook, NFL player
 Jim Crowley, one-fourth of University of Notre Dame's legendary "Four Horsemen" backfield
 Jerry Daanen, NFL player
 Darroll DeLaPorte, NFL player
 Jay DeMerit, soccer player, English Premier League and Major League Soccer, 2010 World Cup team, attended Bay Port High School
 Dutch Dwyer, NFL player
 Riggie Dwyer, NFL player
 Jim Flanigan, NFL player for Chicago Bears, Green Bay Packers, San Francisco 49ers, and Philadelphia Eagles
 Ted Fritsch, NFL player
 Ted Fritsch Jr., NFL player
 Rebecca Giddens, world champion canoer, Olympic medalist
 Scott Hansen, NASCAR driver
 Roger Harring, football coach, University of Wisconsin–La Crosse
 Arnie Herber, NFL player for Green Bay Packers and New York Giants, member of Pro Football Hall of Fame
 Jim Hobbins, NFL player
 Alec Ingold, NFL player for the Las Vegas Raiders
 Fee Klaus, professional football player
 Greg Knafelc, NFL player
 Tod Kowalczyk, head coach of University of Toledo men's basketball team
 Bob Kroll, NFL player
 Gary Kroner, professional football player
 Curly Lambeau, founder, player, and first coach of Green Bay Packers
 Wes Leaper, NFL player
 Jim Magnuson, MLB player
 Charlie Mathys, NFL player for Hammond Pros and Green Bay Packers
 Terrie Miller, Olympic athlete
 Dennis Murphy, Medal of Honor recipient
 Brian Noble, NFL player
 Drew Nowak, NFL player
 Dominic Olejniczak, Mayor of Green Bay, president and chairman of Green Bay Packers
 Robert J. Parins, Wisconsin Circuit Court judge and president of the Green Bay Packers
 Joe Perrault, Olympic athlete
 Joe Proski, NBA head trainer for the Phoenix Suns and member of the team's Ring of Honor
 Ken Radick, NFL player for Green Bay Packers and Brooklyn Dodgers
 Dick Rehbein, NFL assistant coach
 Chester J. Roberts, head coach of the Miami RedHawks football and men's basketball teams
 Chuck Sample, NFL player
 Mary Sauer, pole vaulter
 Max Scharping, NFL player
 Joe Secord, NFL player
 Lauren Sesselmann, professional soccer player
 Walter Wellesley Smith (1905–1982), Pulitzer Prize-winning sportswriter
 Aaron Stecker, NFL player, attended Ashwaubenon High School
 Horst Stemke, Olympic athlete
 Kevin Stemke, NFL player
 Jerry Tagge, NFL player
 Ron Vander Kelen, MVP of 1963 Rose Bowl and NFL player
 Brad Voyles, MLB player
 Max Wagner, MLB player
 Cowboy Wheeler, NFL player
 Charlie Whitehurst, NFL player
 Bob Wickman, Major League Baseball pitcher
 Paul Wilmet, MLB player
 Eliot Wolf, NFL executive
 Vince Workman, NFL player
 Dick Zoll, NFL player for Cleveland Rams and Green Bay Packers

Literature, music, arts

 Karen Borca, musician
 Eric Bray, record producer
 Paul Gigot, Pulitzer Prize-winning journalist
 Richard Gilliam, fantasy author and editor
Thom Hazaert, record producer, journalist, radio personality, film producer/director. Publicly credited with saving Slipknot/Stone Sour vocalist Corey Taylor's life.
 Joel Hodgson, creator and star of TV show Mystery Science Theater 3000, graduated from Ashwaubenon High School in 1978
 Alonzo Myron Kimball, portrait painter and illustrator
 Jim Knipfel, author
 Norbert Kox, painter and writer
 Jeff Kurtenacker, composer
 Doug Larson, newspaper columnist
 Rusty Lemorande, film director, writer, producer and actor
 Pat MacDonald, songwriter and singer in Timbuk3
 Kevin MacLeod, musician and composer
 Leo Ornstein, composer, pianist, finished his life in Green Bay
 Dave Pirner, lead singer of Soul Asylum
 Devon Rodriguez, dancer
 Tony Shalhoub, actor, star of films, stage and TV series Monk and Wings, attended Green Bay East High School
 Mona Simpson, novelist and essayist; younger sister of Steve Jobs, co-founder and CEO of Apple Inc.; wife of Richard Appel, a writer for The Simpsons; Homer Simpson's mother is named after her
 Red Smith, Pulitzer Prize-winning sportswriter
 Zack Snyder, director of films Man of Steel, Dawn of the Dead (2004 version), 300, Watchmen, Justice League
 Margaret Teele (Margaret Poby), actress, attended St. Joseph's Academy (now Notre Dame de la Baie Academy)
 Louise Adeline Weitzel (1862–1934), Pennsylvania Dutch poet

Inventors, business leaders

 Leo Frigo, civic and philanthropic leader
 John J. Gilman, educator and inventor
 Augustin Grignon, fur trader and businessman
 Mark King, CEO, Taco Bell
 Alfred Lawson, credited as inventor of the airliner
 James Mulva, former chairman, president and chief executive officer of ConocoPhillips
 Staci Simonich, scientist
 Daniel Whitney, businessman and pioneer

References

Green Bay
Green Bay, Wisconsin